Rusty Young may refer to:

Rusty Young (musician) (1946-2021), guitarist with the band Poco
Rusty Young (writer) (born 1975), Australian novelist